Governor Lyttelton may refer to:

Charles Lyttelton, 10th Viscount Cobham (1909–1977), 9th Governor-General of New Zealand from 1957 to 1962
William Lyttelton, 1st Baron Lyttelton (1724–1808), Colonial Governor of South Carolina from 1756 to 1760 and Governor of Jamaica from 1762 to 1766